Yizong are imperial temple names used for Chinese emperors. It may refer to:

 Emperor Yizong of Tang (833–873), who ruled Tang from 859 to his death
 Emperor Yizong of Western Xia (1047–1067), who ruled Western Xia from 1048 to his death
 Emperor Aizong of Jin (1198–1234), also known as Emperor Yizong of Jin, who ruled Jin from 1224 to his death
 Chongzhen Emperor (1611–1644), also known as Emperor Yizong of Ming, who ruled Ming from 1627 to his death

See also
 Li Hong (652–675), Tang crown prince who was posthumously honored as Emperor Yizong (not to be confused with Emperor Yizong of Tang)
 Uijong of Goryeo

Temple name disambiguation pages